Thomas William Routledge (18 April 1867 – 9 May 1927) was a cricketer who played Test cricket for South Africa in the 1890s. He was an attacking batsman and occasional bowler.

Thomas Routledge was born in England, where he learned his cricket, and he moved to South Africa in 1889. A hard-hitting batsman with a strong defence, he played first-class cricket for Transvaal during the 1890s and appeared in four Test matches for South Africa against England, all of them in South Africa.  He was an aggressive batsman but often failed to convert a good start into a significant one, only twice reaching 50 in his 24 first-class innings.

His first Test match was the sole representative match of England's visit in 1891–92, played at Cape Town.  He also played in the three-match series of 1895–96 but in all his four Tests he could only manage a top score of 24 as England won each match convincingly.  Routledge's highest first-class score was 77, scored in the 1893-94 Currie Cup match against Eastern Province at Cape Town.

On the day the meeting was held to select South Africa's inaugural side to tour England in 1894, Routledge made a century in a non-first-class match and secured his place as a result of it. None of the 24 matches on the tour have first-class status even though many of them were against first-class county clubs. He was the touring team's second-highest scorer, with 758 runs at an average of 20.21 and a highest score of 152. No obituary appeared in Wisden Cricketers' Almanack for Routledge after his death in 1927.

References

External links
 

1867 births
1927 deaths
South Africa Test cricketers
South African cricketers
Gauteng cricketers
Cricketers from Liverpool